Holding the Baby may refer to:

 Holding the Baby (British TV series), a 1997 ITV sitcom
 Holding the Baby (American TV series), a 1998 FOX sitcom